Mossburn is a small town in the northern Southland region of New Zealand. It is situated 113 km south of Queenstown, 59 km east of Te Anau and 100 km north of Invercargill.  The town is located in a very scenic area, with the mountains of Fiordland creating a beautiful backdrop, with the West Dome (1,271 m) and Mt Hamilton (1,487 m) being prominent land marks.

Demographics
Mossburn is described as a rural settlement by Statistics New Zealand.

Mossburn settlement had a population of 180 at the 2018 New Zealand census, an increase of 6 people (3.4%) since the 2013 census, and a decrease of 15 people (−7.7%) since the 2006 census. There were 78 households. There were 99 males and 84 females, giving a sex ratio of 1.18 males per female, with 30 people (16.7%) aged under 15 years, 30 (16.7%) aged 15 to 29, 84 (46.7%) aged 30 to 64, and 36 (20.0%) aged 65 or older.

Ethnicities were 85.0% European/Pākehā, 15.0% Māori, 1.7% Asian, and 1.7% other ethnicities (totals add to more than 100% since people could identify with multiple ethnicities).

Although some people objected to giving their religion, 56.7% had no religion, 25.0% were Christian, 1.7% were Hindu, 1.7% were Buddhist and 3.3% had other religions.

Of those at least 15 years old, 12 (8.0%) people had a bachelor or higher degree, and 51 (34.0%) people had no formal qualifications. The employment status of those at least 15 was that 84 (56.0%) people were employed full-time, 24 (16.0%) were part-time, and 6 (4.0%) were unemployed.

Mossburn statistical area

Mossburn had a population of 1,209 at the 2018 New Zealand census, an increase of 12 people (1.0%) since the 2013 census, and an increase of 99 people (8.9%) since the 2006 census. There were 471 households. There were 657 males and 555 females, giving a sex ratio of 1.18 males per female. The median age was 35.2 years (compared with 37.4 years nationally), with 285 people (23.6%) aged under 15 years, 219 (18.1%) aged 15 to 29, 585 (48.4%) aged 30 to 64, and 123 (10.2%) aged 65 or older.

Ethnicities were 82.9% European/Pākehā, 7.2% Māori, 1.0% Pacific peoples, 10.4% Asian, and 3.2% other ethnicities (totals add to more than 100% since people could identify with multiple ethnicities).

The proportion of people born overseas was 19.1%, compared with 27.1% nationally.

Although some people objected to giving their religion, 52.4% had no religion, 34.5% were Christian, 2.2% were Hindu, 0.5% were Muslim, 1.5% were Buddhist and 2.0% had other religions.

Of those at least 15 years old, 144 (15.6%) people had a bachelor or higher degree, and 183 (19.8%) people had no formal qualifications. The median income was $38,400, compared with $31,800 nationally. 135 people (14.6%) earned over $70,000 compared to 17.2% nationally. The employment status of those at least 15 was that 585 (63.3%) people were employed full-time, 150 (16.2%) were part-time, and 15 (1.6%) were unemployed.

Agriculture 

The town's main industry is agriculture, with many dairy, cattle, deer, and sheep farms nearby. The town was originally based situated around the four original stations; Centre Hill, Castlerock, West Dome and Dunrobin. Dairy farming has become the major industry of the area. Many large dairy farms have been established over the past ten years, converting from past sheep and other mixed farming activities. .

In the 1890s Mossburn farmer George Chewings developed a successful grass seed for the district’s infertile soil. Chewings fescue Festuca rubra subsp. commutata was an ideal constituent in lawn turfs around the world and was used on the playing surface Wimbledon and landing strips in World War 2.

Deer Capital 

Mossburn lays claim to being the Deer Capital of New Zealand. This is based on the origins of the successful live deer recovery in the wild by helicopter and subsequent first deer farm in New Zealand being established in 1972. This was spurred on by the high venison prices at the time and the near epidemic population levels of red deer in the wild after their introduction earlier in the century. There still remains many deer farms in the community and the Silver Fern Farms venison processing plant which is a major employer for the community.

Rail 

Mossburn's greatest burst of economic activity came as a result of the construction of the Manapouri Power Station. The Mossburn Branch railway had terminated in the town since 1887 and was the closest railway terminus to the project. Previously, the line had been served by two mixed trains of both passengers and freight per week (only freight after 4 October 1937) from Lumsden on the Kingston Branch, but with the commencement of the Manapouri project as well as other government development programmes such as agricultural expansion, one and sometimes two trains would arrive daily from Invercargill. By the start of the 1980s, these projects were complete and the railway closed on 13 December 1982. The Railway Hotel (build 1922) remains as one of the towns social centers, and subsequent old railway lines have been converted into the Around the Mountains Cycle Trail.

Cycle Way 

Around the Mountains Cycle Trail was one of the New Zealand Cycle Trail Quick-Start projects, with $4 million being allocated to complete the Walter Peak to Mossburn stage. Stage One was opened by Deputy Prime Minister, Bill English, in a ceremony at nearby Lumsden on 1 November 2014. The trail begins in Kingston utilizing old railway lines past Garston, Athol, Lumsden and Mossburn to then travels past the Mavora Lakes to end at Walter Peak.

Wind Farm 

During the later part of 2006 and early part of 2007, White Hill Wind Farm was constructed with 29 turbines each of 2.0 MW. In total, it can produce enough electricity to power 30,000 homes when at full capacity. This brought further local employment and financial benefits to the district. The wind farm was officially opened by the Prime Minister of New Zealand, Helen Clark, on 8 June 2007. This project has been greatly supported by the local community and created interest in New Zealand as an example of an alternative energy resource.
Now yearly there is a mountain bike race through the wind farm, the White Hill Classic, that draws in mountain biking enthusiasts from the within region and around the country.

Education

References

External links

2001 census data for Mossburn
2006 census data for Mossburn

Populated places in Southland, New Zealand